The 2005 Czech Republic motorcycle Grand Prix was the eleventh round of the 2005 MotoGP Championship. It took place on the weekend of 26–28 August 2005 at the Masaryk Circuit located in Brno, Czech Republic.  The race saw the beginning of the end of tobacco advertising in Grand Prix motorcycle racing due to a Europe-wide ban.

MotoGP classification

250 cc classification

125 cc classification

Championship standings after the race (motoGP)

Below are the standings for the top five riders and constructors after round eleven has concluded.

Riders' Championship standings

Constructors' Championship standings

 Note: Only the top five positions are included for both sets of standings.

References

Czech Republic motorcycle Grand Prix
Czech Republic
Motorcycle Grand Prix